Shorea crassa is a species of plant in the family Dipterocarpaceae. The species name is derived from Latin ( = thick) and refers to thick leaf blade.

Description
S. crassa is endemic to Borneo. It is found in at least one protected area (Gunung Mulu National Park).

See also
List of Shorea species

References

crassa
Endemic flora of Borneo
Trees of Borneo